Andrew Hines (born May 25, 1983 in Villa Park, California) is a six-time National Hot Rod Association Pro Stock Motorcycle champion. He was the flagship Screamin' Eagle/Vance & Hines Harley-Davidson V-rod. Andrew follows in the footsteps of his brother and crew chief, Matt Hines (NHRA Champion 1996, 97, 98). The team is headed by the legendary duo of Terry Vance and Byron Hines.

Career statistics

2014
Secured his fourth world championship during the season ending event in Pomona
raced to six wins
posted two runner-up finishes during the year
won the inaugural MiraMonte Records Pro Bike Battle in Sonoma

2013
Raced to only victory of the season at Charlotte 2
Posted a semifinal finish at Denver
Qualified a season-best third at Houston
 Finished outside top 10 points standings for only second time in his career

2012
Had career-best season with six wins in 11 final round appearances
finished second in championship points standings

2011
Set his career-best E.T. and speed
Won the Indianapolis and Pomona 2 rounds
Finished third in the championship points standings

2010
Won five races, tying his career best wins in a season
Raced to seven consecutive final-round appearances with three wins and four runner-up finishes
Made the Playoffs for the fourth consecutive season
Set a career-best for elapsed time at Indianapolis
Won multiple races for the seventh consecutive season

2009
Was the No. 1 qualifier four times during the season
Made the Playoffs for the third consecutive season
Posted career best elapsed time at St. Louis
Won multiple races for the sixth consecutive season

2008
Went to the final round at three of the first four races with wins at Atlanta and St. Louis
Led the point standings from Race 3 through Race 10
Matched his second-best round-win total of 31
Competed in his 100th career race

2007
Earned an appearance in the inaugural Countdown to 4 and Countdown to 1
Won a career best five of seven final round appearances
Set his career best elapsed time

2006
Earned his third world championship title 
Won three of five final round appearances
Set career best elapsed time
Won Ringer's Pro Bike Battle

2005
Earned second consecutive world championship title
Became first rider to run sub six seconds; Set national records for elapsed time (6.968 seconds) and speed (197.45 mph)
Won two of five final round appearances
Topped the qualifying fields at nine of 15 events

2004
Won first career powerade world championship and first for Harley Davidson
Led the point standings for the entire season
Earned a category-best eight No. 1 qualifying positions
Won three of four final-round appearances

2003
Was the runner-up at Sonoma, the first final round appearance of his career

2002
Made professional debut at Denver
Qualified for every event he entered
Advanced to the semifinals at Reading, his fifth career race
Finalist for the Auto Club Road to the Future award honoring the NHRA's Rookie of the Year
Dated Rachel Prince from Denham Springs, LA

Personal
Wife: Tanya Joy
Sons: Rion (8/24/00), Declan (7/28/2010)
Height/weight: 6´0´´, 160 lbs.
Hobbies: Scuba diving, hiking, go-kart racing
Hometown: Avon, Indiana

References

1983 births
Living people
American motorcycle racers
People from Villa Park, California
Sportspeople from Orange County, California
People from Avon, Indiana